This is a list of National Rail stations in the ceremonial county of Cumbria by 2017/2018 entries and exits, based on the UK Office of Rail and Road reports 2016-18.

List

See also

List of United Kingdom railway stations

Further reading 

 Edgar, Gordon, Cumbrian Steam (Amberley Publishing, 2014), 
 George, A.D. and D. Brumhead, Cumbrian Industrial Archaeology. A Field Guide (Manchester: Manchester Polytechnic, 1988)
 Joy, David, The Lake counties, Regional history of the railways of Great Britain, 14, 2nd edn (David St John Thomas, 1990), .
 Robinson, P., Carlisle: 150 Years of Railways (Ian Allen, 1986)
 Robinson, Peter W., Cumbria's Lost Railways (Stenlake Publishing, 2002)
 Salveson Paul, The Settle-Carlisle Railway (Ramsbury: Crowood, 2019),

References

Railway stations in Cumbria
Cumbria